The Canyon rifle (shorthand for cross-canyon rifle) is a concept familiar to sporting riflemen.  The term came into general use in the USA from the 1960s onwards, and alludes to a type of rifle cartridge or rifle-cartridge combination that will shoot very accurately and with an exceptionally flat trajectory out to distances of 300 - 500 yards, thereby minimising the need for very precise distance-judging before taking a shot.  Cartridge-rifle combinations with extremely flat-shooting characteristics are especially appreciated by those sportsmen who hunt in steep, mountainous terrain, often having to make informed "guesstimates" about the distances of deer and other game animals seen on the far sides of dead ground such as valleys and canyons - hence the term.

Although any very high velocity, flat-shooting cartridge-rifle combo will qualify as a canyon rifle, the term has been particularly associated with the very flat-shooting ranges of magnum cartridges, and appropriately chambered rifles, devised and marketed by Roy Weatherby and, more recently, by Lazzeroni.

An important English rifle and cartridge designer who sought a ballistic solution to shooting in mountainous surroundings was David Lloyd, who developed the .244 H&H Magnum cartridge and the Lloyd rifle during the 1950s specifically for such conditions.

Hunting equipment
Rifles
Hunting rifles